Marasia (Greek: Μαράσια, Turkish: Maraş, Bulgarian:Maраш) is a village in the northern part of the Evros regional unit in Greece. Marasia is part of the municipal unit of Trigono. In 2011 its population was 140. It is situated between the rivers Evros and Ardas, close to their confluence. The Evros forms the border with Turkey here, and the Turkish city Edirne is 7 km to its east. Marasia is bypassed by the Greek National Road 51/E85 (Alexandroupoli - Orestiada - Ormenio - Svilengrad).

Population

See also
 List of settlements in the Evros regional unit

External links
 Marassia on GTP Travel Pages

References

Trigono
Populated places in Evros (regional unit)